This Time is the fifth album by American country music artist Dwight Yoakam, released by Reprise Records on March 23, 1993. Three of its tracks barely missed the top spot on the Billboard Hot Country Singles charts, each peaking at #2: "Ain't That Lonely Yet", "A Thousand Miles from Nowhere" and "Fast as You", the latter being his last Top 10 single. Two other tracks also rose into the charts: "Try Not to Look So Pretty" at #14 and "Pocket of a Clown" at #22. The album itself peaked at #4 on the Top Country Albums chart. Yoakam wrote or co-wrote all except for one of the tracks on this album.

Recording
While still rooted in country, This Time sees Yoakam branching out far beyond the honky-tonk sound of his early albums.  With production help from Dusty Wakeman, longtime producer and guitarist Pete Anderson was able to add depth and dimension to an already full sound, where the echoes of early rock and soul entwine the honky tonk tempos and instruments and become something wholly other. Anderson later stated the LP was an attempt to fulfill the artistic mission started with the previous album If There Was a Way and create a distinct musical identity:

Anderson, who used Pro Tools for the album, also admitted putting "A Thousand Miles from Nowhere" on the album was the biggest decision of all, since it was so unlike anything Yoakam had recorded before, and the singer himself admitted to Us in 1993, "Oftentimes we're not doing country music anymore. But that's okay.  Country music is not where I'll remain, but it's a place I'll always return to."  Although This Time was not a number one country album, nor did it produce any chart-topping singles, it was Yoakam's biggest album, going triple platinum and even made the top twenty-five of the pop charts.

Composition
Yoakam renewed his songwriting collaboration with Kostas, which started on his previous album, composing four of the LP's eleven tracks with him. As AllMusic critic Thom Jurek notes, "...in Kostas, Yoakam found a writer as interested in textures as in unique ways to use his voice. 'Two Doors Down' is a stunning example, as is the lone cover on the disc, by Kostas and James House, 'Ain't That Lonely Yet,' where Yoakam moves into Roy Orbison territory with strings and lush backdrops that meld Bakersfield with Pitney's conceptual mini-soundtracks and the arrangements on Jim Reeves' best records." First single "Ain't That Lonely Yet" is an orchestrated mid-tempo song featuring a string arrangement by Paul Buckmaster, known for his work with Elton John. Yoakam and Kostas also collaborated on the title track, a Buck Owens–inspired groove that Yoakam would introduce in concerts as "psychobilly."

The songs Yoakam wrote on his own showed continued artistic growth, especially on "A Thousand Miles from Nowhere", which Anderson told the Journal of Country Music was "one of the more experimental songs Dwight has ever written," and added that the song's long outro was inspired by "Layla" by Derek and the Dominos. It debuted at #72 on the U.S. Billboard Hot Country Singles & Tracks for the week of June 26, 1993 and eventually peaked at #2. The music video for the song was co-directed by Yoakam and Carolyn Mayer, and features Yoakam riding on a Copper Basin Railway train across the Arizona desert, and is shown in two frames showing mostly different views of the train and Yoakam; fellow musician Kelly Willis does a cameo appearance as the young woman standing in a shallow stream. Another hit from Yoakam's pen was "Fast as You", which, propelled by its circular "Pretty Woman"-like guitar hook and smoky keyboards, also hit #2 on the country singles chart and landed on the Billboard Hot 100, peaking at #70 and representing Yoakam's commercial zenith. The remaining originals are rooted in country, with the kitschy "Pocket of a Clown" hearkening back to his earlier cover of Lefty Frizzell's "Always Late with Your Kisses" with its prominent background singers, and "Home for Sale," which utilizes the B3 Hammond organ that was introduced on his previous album.

"A Thousand Miles from Nowhere" was featured as the closing credits music for the film Red Rock West, in which Yoakam also made his film acting debut. "Wild Ride" was later covered by Kenny Chesney as a duet with Joe Walsh on Chesney's 2007 album Just Who I Am: Poets & Pirates.

Reception

This Time remains the biggest selling album of Yoakam's career, going triple platinum. Rolling Stone magazine gave the album four stars, while AllMusic awarded This Time five-out-of-five stars. Reviewer Thom Jurek concluded, "This album is a welcome addition to Yoakam's formidable catalog. This Time is no sell out; it's a new way to present the timelessness of hard, torn, wasted-love country love songs with less reckless sentimentality and more honest emotion."

Track listing

Personnel
Beth Andersen – background vocals
Pete Anderson – electric guitar
Chuck Domanico – upright bass
Jeff Donavan – drums
Skip Edwards – keyboards
Tommy Funderburk – background vocals
Jim Haas – background vocals
Scott Humphrey – programming
Carl Jackson – background vocals
Scott Joss – fiddle
Jim Lauderdale – background vocals
Dean Parks – acoustic guitar
Al Perkins – Dobro, lap steel guitar, pedal steel guitar
Taras Prodaniuk – bass guitar
Don Reed – fiddle
Dwight Yoakam – lead vocals, background vocals, acoustic guitar

Strings conducted and arranged by Paul Buckmaster and contracted by Suzy Katayama.

Charts

Weekly charts

Year-end charts

Singles

References

Bibliography

1993 albums
Dwight Yoakam albums
Albums arranged by Paul Buckmaster
Albums produced by Pete Anderson
Reprise Records albums
Albums recorded at Capitol Studios